BlueBay Asset Management LLP is one of Europe's largest managers of fixed income credit and alternative investment strategies.

History
BlueBay Asset Management was founded in 2001.  The company was initially established to capitalise on strong growth trends in the European corporate and global emerging debt markets.

Today BlueBay is one of Europe's largest specialist managers of fixed income credit and alternative strategies.

Royal Bank of Canada agreed to acquire the company in October 2010, in a deal valued at £963 million ($1.54 billion), completed on 17 December 2010. BlueBay is currently a part of the RBC asset management division, under the RBC Global Asset Management group of companies.

Operations
Based in London, with offices in the US, Luxembourg, Hong Kong, Switzerland, Ireland and Japan, BlueBay manages over US$67 billion (as at 30 October 2020) for institutions and high-net-worth-individuals.

BlueBay manages a combination of long-only and alternative debt strategies covering investment grade, high yield/distressed, convertibles and emerging markets. Their clients are offered a selection of risk/return profiles, from absolute return long/short funds to relative return long-only funds and segregated accounts. BlueBay also has a private debt offering.

References

External links
BlueBay Asset Management official site
RBC GAM official site

Financial services companies established in 2001
Companies formerly listed on the London Stock Exchange
Investment management companies of the United Kingdom
Companies based in the City of Westminster